The 2020 United States presidential election in Delaware was held on Tuesday, November 3, 2020, as part of the 2020 United States presidential election in which all 50 states plus the District of Columbia participated. Delaware voters chose electors to represent them in the Electoral College via a popular vote, pitting the Republican Party's nominee, incumbent President Donald Trump from Florida, and running mate Vice President Mike Pence from Indiana against Democratic Party nominee, former Vice President Joe Biden, and his running mate California Senator Kamala Harris. Delaware has three electoral votes in the Electoral College.

Delaware is the home state of Biden, who represented the state in the U.S. Senate for 36 years from 1973 to 2009. Biden defeated Trump in the state by a margin of 19%, a significant improvement over Hillary Clinton's 11% margin over Trump in 2016, and even a slight improvement over Obama's margin in 2012. Biden flipped the swing county of Kent, while Sussex County, which last voted Democratic on the Presidential level when Bill Clinton carried it in 1996, stayed Republican. Delaware's remaining county, New Castle—home to Biden's hometown of Wilmington and part of both the Northeast megalopolis and the Philadelphia metropolitan area, containing 55% of the state's population—stayed Democratic, having last voted Republican when George H. W. Bush carried it in 1988. Biden's margin in New Castle County would have been more than enough to carry the state; he carried his home county by over 106,000 votes, far exceeding his statewide margin of 96,000 votes.

Per exit polls by the Associated Press, Biden's strength in his home state came from African-Americans with 91%; and Caucasians with 50%, including those with a college degree with 54%. 59% of Delawarean voters had a favorable opinion of him. Biden won overwhelmingly in his hometown of Wilmington, earning 26,698 votes to Trump's 3,580.

With Biden's victory nationwide, he became the first person representing Delaware ever elected President of the United States.

Primary elections
The primary elections were originally scheduled for April 28, 2020. On March 24, they were moved to June 2 due to concerns over the COVID-19 pandemic. On May 7, the primary elections were again postponed to July 7. By that time, President Donald Trump of the Republican Party and former Vice President Joe Biden of the Democratic Party had already clinched enough delegates to become the presumptive nominees of their respective parties. This was Biden's third presidential attempt, as he had previously campaigned in the 1988 and 2008 Democratic presidential primaries but failed to secure the nomination both times.

Republican primary
Incumbent President Donald Trump was essentially uncontested in the Republican primary. The state has 16 delegates to the 2020 Republican National Convention.

However, Trump was not unopposed: Rocky De La Fuente took 12% of the vote, with Trump polling 88%.

Democratic primary

General election

Predictions

Polling

Aggregate polls

Donald Trump vs. Michael Bloomberg

Donald Trump vs. Pete Buttigieg

Donald Trump vs. Bernie Sanders

Donald Trump vs. Elizabeth Warren

Results

Results by county

Counties that flipped from Republican to Democratic
Kent (largest city: Dover)

By congressional district
Due to the state's low population, only one congressional district is allocated. This district is called the At-Large district, because it covers the entire state, and thus is equivalent to the statewide election results.

Turnout
According to the Delaware's Elections website, voter turnout was 68.86% with 509,241 ballots cast out of 739,570 registered voters.

Notes

See also
 United States presidential elections in Delaware
 2020 United States presidential election
 2020 Democratic Party presidential primaries
 2020 Republican Party presidential primaries
 2020 United States elections

References

Further reading

External links
 
 
  (State affiliate of the U.S. League of Women Voters)
 

Delaware
2020
Presidential